Founded in 1869, the Waukee United Methodist Church is one of the oldest churches in Waukee, Iowa.

History
The church first met in the Des Moines Valley rail depot.  Under the name of First Methodist Episcopal Church of Waukee, the church moved into its own building in 1878, shortly before the town incorporated.

Buildings
 1877: An unfinished church was bought and completed in 1878.
 1900: A new church was built on the existing foundation using material from the old church.
 1953: An educational unit was added to the church.
 1978: A new building was completed adjacent to the old building.

Stained Glass Windows
In 1900 four stained glassed windows were given to the church as a memorial.  In 1901 a cathedral window was presented to the church by the Epworth League, and in on completion of a league room in 1914 a memorial window showing Jesus in the Garden of Gethsemane was installed.

All the stained glass windows are now located in the sanctuary of the current church.  However, the four windows donated in 1900 were stored in a corncrib for 16 years by a church trustee until a renovation in 1995.

The church today
Led by Reverend Jamie Cutler, the church runs a preschool, sponsors a Boy Scout troop, has a thriving ministry in Change A Child's Story, and participates in area charities including the Waukee Area Christian Food Pantry. The church is a member of the Iowa Annual Conference of The United Methodist Church.

References

 History of Waukee, City of Waukee official web site, retrieved 2008-02-21

External links
 Waukee United Methodist Church, official web site
 Iowa Annual Conference of The United Methodist Church, official web site

Religious organizations established in 1869
United Methodist churches in Iowa
Churches in Dallas County, Iowa
19th-century Methodist church buildings
1869 establishments in Iowa